Crevarska Strana is a village in central Croatia, in the municipality of Gvozd, Sisak-Moslavina County. Between 1953 and 1971, the village was known as Vladimirovo (named after Croatian poet and politician Vladimir Nazor). It is connected by the D6 highway.

History
Like other settlements in the area, Crevarska Strana settlement was established in the late 17th century to become a part of the Military Frontier which, at the time, was expanding onto former Ottoman territories such as Lika, Kordun, Banija and lower Slavonia. In the 18th century, it belonged to the Glina regiment. The development of the Vrginmost-Karlovac railway line in 1905 was important for the development of the village as it both provided employment (i.e. railway maintenance work) and allowed residents to seek employment and engage in trade further afield. In 1918, the village became a part of the Serbian-Croatian-Slovenian Kingdom and later on, the Kingdom of Yugoslavia.

The village suffered heavy demographic losses in the World war II losing nearly 37% (155 men and 37 women) of its pre-war population of 521. Out of 135 civilian victims of fascism, 68 (all men) perished in the Glina massacre on 3 August 1941, with another 16 perishing in the Ivanović Jarak massacre. The first civilian victims lost their lives already in May 1941 perishing in the Jadovno concentration camp. After being heavily hit by brutal Ustaše campaign in late spring and summer 1941, the population joined the antifascist resistance movement en masse.

Demographics
According to the 2011 census, the village of Crevarska Strana has 161 inhabitants. This represents 37.88% of its pre-war population according to the 1991 census.

Population by ethnicity 
 

{{Kretanje broja stanovnika
 |naslov  = 'Population change 1857-2011 Naselja i stanovništvo Republike Hrvatske 1857-2001, www.dzs.hr
 |dimx    = 550
 |dimy    = 
 |stanmax = 550
 |crta1   = 100
 |crta2   = 50
 |a1      = 1857
 |a2      = 1869
 |a3      = 1880
 |a4      = 1890
 |a5      = 1900
 |a6      = 1910
 |a7      = 1921
 |a8      = 1931
 |a9      = 1948
 |a10     = 1953
 |a11     = 1961
 |a12     = 1971
 |a13     = 1981
 |a14     = 1991
 |a15     = 2001
 |a16     = 2011
 |p1      = 0
 |p2      = 0
 |p3      = 0
 |p4      = 0
 |p5      = 0
 |p6      = 0
 |p7      = 171
 |p8      = 0
 |p9      = 0
 |p10     = 543
 |p11     = 530
 |p12     = 515
 |p13     = 469
 |p14     = 425
 |p15     = 262
 |p16     = 161
 |izvor   = Croatian Bureau of Statistics
 }}

NOTE: Data for the village of Crevarska Strana is reported from 1921 on. From 1953 to 1971, data is reported under the name of Vladimirovo. Data from the 1931 and 1948 censuses is contained in data for Vrginmost settlement. 

 Sights 

 The site of formation of the partisan 8th Kordun Division (Cro: 8. Kordunaška udarna divizija'') on 22 November 1942 8. кордунашка дивизија НОВЈ
 Monument to the uprising of the people of Kordun and Banija

Notable natives and residents

See also 
 Glina massacres

References 

Populated places in Sisak-Moslavina County
Serb communities in Croatia